Nice & Smooth is an East Coast hip hop duo from New York City that consists of Gregory O. "Greg Nice" Mays (born May 30, 1967) and Darryl O. "Smooth B" Barnes (born August 3, 1967) plus their deejay Tedd "DJ Teddy Tedd" Whiting. The duo released four albums between 1989 and 1997.

Their first collaborative appearance was on the single "Dope on a Rope"/"Skill Trade" on Strange Family Records in 1987. On the strength of that underground single they managed a guest spot on the song "Pimpin Ain't Easy" by Big Daddy Kane on his 1989 album It's a Big Daddy Thing.

Discography

Studio albums

Singles

As lead artist

Featured singles

Guest appearances

References

Notes

Citations

External links
Nice & Smooth at AllMusic
Nice & Smooth at Discogs

African-American musical groups
American musical duos
East Coast hip hop groups
Hip hop duos
Hip hop groups from New York City
Entertainers from the Bronx